The Roman Catholic Archdiocese of Valencia en Venezuela is an archdiocese located in the city of Valencia in Venezuela.

History
On 12 October 1922 Pope Pius XI established the Diocese of Valencia from the Metropolitan Archdiocese of Caracas.  Pope Paul VI elevated the diocese to an archdiocese on 12 November 1974.

Bishops

Ordinaries
Francisco Antonio Granadillo † (22 Jun 1923 – 13 Jan 1927)
Salvador Montes de Oca † (20 Jun 1927 – 22 Dec 1934)
Gregorio Adam Dalmau † (29 Aug 1937 – 12 Jul 1961)
José Alí Lebrún Moratinos † (19 Mar 1962 – 21 Sep 1972) Appointed, Coadjutor Archbishop of Caracas; future Cardinal
Luis Eduardo Henríquez Jiménez † (9 Nov 1972 – 16 Mar 1990)
Jorge Liberato Urosa Savino † (16 Mar 1990 – 19 Sep 2005) Appointed, Archbishop of Caracas (Cardinal in 2006)
Reinaldo del Prette Lissot † (10 Apr 2007 – 21 November 2022)

Auxiliary bishops
José Joaquín Troconis Montiel (1977-1986)
Nelson Antonio Martinez Rust (1982-1992), appointed Bishop of San Felipe
Reinaldo del Prette Lissot † (1993-1997), appointed Coadjutor Bishop of Maracay (later returned here as Archbishop)
José Sótero Valero Ruz † (1998-2001), appointed Bishop of Guanare

Other priests of this diocese who became bishops
Alfredo José Rodríguez Figueroa † , appointed Auxiliary Bishop of Caracas, Santiago de Venezuela in 1974
Diego Rafael Padrón Sánchez, appointed Auxiliary Bishop of Caracas, Santiago de Venezuela in 1990
Ramón Antonio Linares Sandoval, appointed Bishop of Puerto Cabello on 1994
Tulio Luis Ramírez Padilla, appointed Auxiliary Bishop of Caracas, Santiago de Venezuela in 2012

Suffragan dioceses
 Maracay 
 Puerto Cabello
 San Carlos de Venezuela

See also
Roman Catholicism in Venezuela

Sources
 GCatholic.org
 Catholic Hierarchy 
 Diocese website

Roman Catholic dioceses in Venezuela
Roman Catholic Ecclesiastical Province of Valencia en Venezuela
Christian organizations established in 1922
Roman Catholic dioceses and prelatures established in the 20th century
1922 establishments in Venezuela